The Pravda class or P-class submarines were built for the Soviet Navy in the mid-1930s. They originally served as training ships, then later served in World War II for mainly transport duties. They were intended to operate with the surface fleet but failed to meet specifications, particularly for surface speed. The initial design envisaged  guns for surface action. These boats had a long building time, being laid down in 1931 and completed in 1936.

They were double hull boats with eight compartments. Their main shortcomings were underpowered machinery, a long diving time and poor seakeeping. Weakness in hull strength had to be remedied by stiffening and weight cutting. Yakubov and Worth state that these were the least successful Soviet submarines of this era and were relegated to secondary duties on completion. The two surviving boats had their conning towers re-built to resemble the later K class.

Ships
Three boats were built by Ordzhinikidze Yard Leningrad. All served with the Baltic Fleet.
 P1 Pravda (Truth) - Launched 3 January 1934 - sunk off Hango, Finland, 17 September 1941
 P2 Zvezda (Star) - Launched 1935 - Broken up 1956
 P3 Iskra (Spark) - Launched 1934 - Broken up 1952

A fourth boat was planned but not laid down.

References

Bibliography
 
 Conway's All the World's Fighting Ships 1922–1946
 Vladimir Yakubov and Richard Worth, Raising the Red Banner -2008 Spellmount

External links
 Pravda class at uboat.net

Submarine classes
Submarines of the Soviet Navy